Summerset may refer to:

Places 
 Summerset, South Dakota, a city in South Dakota
 Summerset at Frick Park, a residential development in Pittsburgh, Pennsylvania
 Lake Summerset, Illinois, a census-designated place in Illinois
 Summerset Township, Adair County, Iowa, a township in Iowa
 Summerset Trail, a rail trail in Iowa
 Winterset, Iowa, a city in Iowa which was originally to be named Summerset

Other uses 
Summerset, an expansion pack for the video game The Elder Scrolls Online

See also 
 Somerset (disambiguation)
 Summerseat, a village in Greater Manchester, England